Shahzada Muhammad Muhi us-Sunnat Mirza (Persian: شاهزاده محمد محی وسنت میرزا) was the eldest surviving son of Prince Muhammad Kam Bakhsh, himself the youngest son of Emperor Aurangzeb. He was imprisoned in the Palace-Prison of Salimgarh after his fathers defeat in 1709 at the hands of his brother, Emperor Bahadur Shah I, in a war of succession. He remained in prison until his death on 29 January 1747, during the reign of Muhammad Shah. His only son Prince Muhi ul-Millat was raised the throne in December 1759 as Shah Jahan III by the Grand Vizier Imad ul-Mulk Ghaziuddin Khan Feroz Jung III, but was deposed the following year by the Marathas.

References

1709 deaths
Year of birth unknown
Mughal princes
People from Delhi